The Fifty-Fifty Girl is a lost 1928 American silent comedy film directed by Clarence Badger and starring Bebe Daniels and James Hall as co-owners of a gold mine.

Cast
Bebe Daniels as Kathleen O'Hara
James Hall as Jim Donahue
Harry T. Morey as Arnold Morgan
William Austin as Engineer
George Kotsonaros as Buck
Johnnie Morris as Oscar, a thug
Alfred Allen as Kathleen's Uncle
Jack O'Hara  
Constantine Romanoff (uncredited)

References

External links

French language lobby poster to the film(Wayback)
Still at gettyimages.com

American silent feature films
Films directed by Clarence G. Badger
Paramount Pictures films
Films based on short fiction
1928 comedy films
Silent American comedy films
American black-and-white films
Lost American films
Lost comedy films
1928 lost films
1920s American films
1920s English-language films